Ntando Lucky Kebe (born 19 August 1988) is a South African rugby union player, who most recently played domestic Currie Cup rugby with the  and Super Rugby with the . His regular position is scrum-half.

Career

Youth

Border Bulldogs
He quickly established himself as a regular for the senior side and played in both the Vodacom Cup and Currie Cup competitions between 2010 and 2012, accumulating 42 appearances in total.

Boland Cavaliers

Griquas
He joined  for the 2014 season.

Border Bulldogs

At the start of 2016, Kebe was one of six Border Bulldogs players that joined the ' Super Rugby squad for a trial period as they prepared for the 2016 Super Rugby season.

Representative rugby
In 2012, he was included in a South African Barbarians (South) team that faced England during the 2012 mid-year rugby test series. The following year, he was included in a South Africa President's XV team that played in the 2013 IRB Tbilisi Cup and won the tournament after winning all three matches.

In 2016, Kebe was included in a South Africa 'A' squad that played a two-match series against a touring England Saxons team. He didn't play in their first match in Bloemfontein, but was named on the bench for the second match of the series, coming on as a second-half replacement in a 26–29 defeat to the Saxons in George.

Drugs ban

On 1 March 2016, Kebe provided an out-of-competition urine sample, which tested positively for prohibited substance stanozolol, and was officially charged with an anti-doping violation on 2 August 2017. He pleaded guilty, claiming that former team-mate Monde Hadebe gave him a supplement that contained the substance, and received a two-year ban with effect from 7 July 2016. Kebe launched an appeal against the decision, in which the appeals panel ruled that his ban should be changed from two years to four years, with Kebe allowed to return to rugby on 8 July 2020.

References

1988 births
Living people
Boland Cavaliers players
Border Bulldogs players
Doping cases in rugby union
Rugby union players from East London, Eastern Cape
Rugby union scrum-halves
South African rugby union players
Southern Kings players